In Full Gear is the second studio album by American hip hop band Stetsasonic, released in 1988 by Tommy Boy Records.

Music and lyrics 
In Full Gear is a double album that draws on various influences in its hip hop style, including R&B, jazz, dancehall reggae, and rock influences. It also incorporates beat-boxing, sampling technology, and live band performance. "Freedom or Death" and "Talkin' All That Jazz" discuss credos of revolution and sampling, respectively. On "Float On", a remake of The Floaters' 1977 song of the same name, rapper Wise envisions "a woman with a realistic imagination, a woman who thinks for herself, whose thoughts are bold and free".

Critical reception 

In a contemporary review for The Village Voice, music critic Robert Christgau found the "well-meaning" band merely competent musically and said that their cover of "Float On" is "even ickier than the original". He was more enthusiastic about "Freedom or Death" and "Talking All That Jazz", and felt that In Full Gear succeeds on "a camaraderie that reaches deeper than the usual homeboy bonding". In his own list for the Pazz & Jop critics poll, Christgau named "Talkin' All That Jazz" the seventeenth best single of 1988.

Track listing

Charts

Weekly charts

Year-end charts

Singles

References

External links 
 

1988 albums
Stetsasonic albums
Tommy Boy Records albums
Albums produced by Prince Paul (producer)
Rap rock albums by American artists